The 1957 San Jose State Spartans football team represented San Jose State College during the 1957 NCAA University Division football season.

San Jose State played as an Independent in 1957. The team was led by first-year head coach Bob Titchenal, and played home games at Spartan Stadium in San Jose, California. The Spartans finished the 1957 season with a record of three wins and seven losses (3–7). Overall, the team was outscored by its opponents 123–196 for the season.

Schedule

Team players in the NFL
The following San Jose State players were selected in the 1958 NFL Draft.

The following finished their San Jose State career in 1957, were not drafted, but played in the NFL.

Notes

References

San Jose State
San Jose State Spartans football seasons
San Jose State Spartans football